The Hangdogs was an American roots rock band from New York City. The lead singer-songwriter was Matthew Grimm. The rest of the band consisted of guitarist and pedal steel player Automatic Slim, bass guitarists J.C. Chmiel and Rob Gottstein, and drummers Kevin Baier and Dave Stengel. The line-up also included keyboardist/guitarist Kevin Karg in the early 2000s. 

The band was largely active in the late 1990s through early 2000s.

Albums 
Same Old Story (1997)
East of Yesterday (1998)
Beware of Dog (2000)
Something Left to Sell (2002)
Wallace '48 (2003)

References

External links
Official Site

American alternative country groups
Musical groups established in the 1990s